Talou Sen Chey is a district in Pursat province, Cambodia. It was established on January 8, 2019 according to sub-decree no. 07 អនក្រ.បក by taking Talou Commune from Bakan district, and Phteah Rung Commune from Phnum Kravanh district. Two villages – Koh Svay and Koh Wat – of Khnar Totueng Commune, Bakan district became part of Talou commune. The district capital is at Phteah Rung Commune.

Location
Bakan shares a border with Battambang province to the north and the district of Veal Veang to the northwest. To the south and west is Phnum Kravanh. Talou Sen Chey shares its eastern border with Bakan district.

Administration 
The following table shows the villages of Talou Sen Chey district by commune.

References

Districts of Pursat province